Claudia Manfrin Alende (born 9 October 1996) is a Brazilian/American actress, and singer, the owner of Blanc Media and founder of Burger Babes.

Early life 
Alende was born in Francisco Beltrão, Paraná, and moved to Sao Paulo when she was 20. She is daughter of doctor Claudio Alende and attorney Dolores Manfrin Alende. As a child, she was considered a "tomboy"; she had no interest in pursuing a modelling career, preferring to spend her time playing video games. Her mother's friends and even strangers would compliment Claudia's modelling potential.

Career 
In 2014, Alende participated in the Miss Bumbum contest and finished in second place, losing to Indianara Carvalho.
By 2015, she was being followed by 2.8 million people on Instagram and had made £2.1 million from high-profile social media endorsements.

Alende next founded Blanc Media, an entertainment company that works with international talent currently exceeding a 50 million network on Instagram. The company involvements include music production, films and marketing.

On 29 January 2017, she was the judge of the Model Scout ID event together with Marcus Pelle, owner of DAS Models. The event was held in Barranquilla, Colombia. She had to choose one model out of 100 contestants.

In June 2017, Alende was included in a feature by Forbes magazine as one of their top 15 Instagram influencers. The magazine commented: "As both a model and businesswomen this Brazilian influencer offers a combination of health and beauty content, business advice, motivational content, and lifestyle images. Known for both her beauty and business success, Claudia puts forward the image of the modern woman who can succeed in all aspects of life."

On 4 December 2017, she released her debut single "I'm Good at Being Bad". On 10 August 2018, she released the single "Spotlight". On 22 March 2019, she released the single "Scared to Be Alone". On 23 August 2019, she released the single "Summer Crime".

On 1 April 2019, she co-founded Burger Babes, a hamburger delivery service.

On 7 February 2021, she starred in a Super Bowl commercial "All-Star Cast" for Michelob Ultra.

Discography

Filmography

Film

Awards 
"I'm Good at Being Bad" (music video)
Special Mention Award at the Asia South East-Short Film Festival (2018)

References 

1996 births
Brazilian female models
Living people
21st-century Brazilian women singers
21st-century Brazilian singers
21st-century Brazilian women